John A. Gauci-Maistre was born in Sliema in 1947, the son of the late Judge Agostino Gauci-Maistre and Winnifred Mifsud. He attended the St. Aloysius College in Malta and after completing his studies he swiftly moved into a business career in the U.K. During his employment in London with Southwell & Tyrrel he became acquainted with managerial and accounting aspects of the business.  After a few years in the U.K., he moved back to Malta and immediately became a business partner in the management of Penta Hotel in Paceville. This experience further ingrained in him an entrepreneurial spirit that he soon used in the setting up of companies that are not only household names in Malta in their respective industry but are synonymous with Gauci-Maistre.

Gauci-Maistre is a frequent contributor to various publications such as  Lloyd's and FairPlay. He was also a main contributor to the Malta Business Blog.

Economicard Group of Companies

The Economicard Group of Companies is an umbrella of companies that Gauci-Maistre established. The group of companies consists of GM International Services Limited, Economicard Worldwide Limited, GM Corporate, and Fiduciary Services Limited, GM Conferences and Exhibitions, GM and Associates-Advocates, and GM For You, which is the group's Corporate Social Responsibility agency.

Economicard Worldwide Limited 

Upon gaining independence in 1964, Malta, by and large, had to start anew and from then onwards it had to build an economy based on human resources including manufacturing, tourism, and services. This evolution of the Maltese economy began during the following decade when the Maltese economy had to become less dependent on the British military services in Malta.

Gauci-Maistre immediately realized the growing spending potential of the Maltese people and in 1973 he launched an innovative venture in Malta that would be a trendsetter in the Maltese economy. This clever move resulted in the establishment of Economicard Worldwide Limited.  Initially, the company introduced the Cash Discount Card through which shoppers would receive discounts across shopping outlets around the island by purchasing the card.  After its initial success, other services were added to the card including travel services which were becoming increasingly popular amongst Maltese, especially after the establishment in 1973 of Air Malta, the national airline.  The company was at the forefront of travel services and as a testimony to its success, the company was appointed the General Sales Agent of Olympic Airways in 1981 till 2009 when it was sold off by the Greek Government.

Commodore 
In 1978 Gauci-Maistre obtained representation for Commodore and immediately embarked on promoting this home computer in Malta. In 1985 he introduced Amiga to Malta; the Amiga consequently became a household name in Malta. The company was the general sales agent of these computers on the island. The company also offered computer courses to the general public to acquaint them with this new medium.

GM International Services Limited 

In 1973 the Parliament of Malta enacted the Merchant Shipping Act that introduced the Malta Ship Register. In January 1974, he incorporated GM International Services Limited, more affectionately known as GMI by many in the shipping industry. This move was intended to capitalize on the introduction of the Malta Ship Register.  Indeed, Gauci-Maistre believed in the benefits Malta had to offer and immediately started working to attract ship operators to Malta. The hardworking nature of his character proved useful and in 1978 he registered his first vessel the MV Elmare. Gauci-Maistre was described as the one who put Malta on the world shipping map by Shipping International 2008. During one of the numerous interviews with shipping news publishers he admitted that the road to making a success out of GMI was not easy as the Greek ship operators in particular were skeptical of the advantages Malta offered at the time.

Gauci-Maistre never wavered and continued his hard work to attract more companies to Malta, making Greece his second home in the process.  Results started flowing in and until 1987 GM International Services Limited commanded 95% of Malta's tonnage.  Due to the acquired respect both in Malta and abroad, Gauci-Maistre is often consulted on matters relating to the maritime industry. He was instrumental in bringing about policy changes at Transport Malta (formerly Malta Maritime Authority) in particular in relation to the merchant shipping company structure, Flag State Inspections, and the introduction of foreign-owned vessels under the Malta Maritime Flag. During another interview with Shipping International 2010, he explained in detail the issue of flag state inspections.   Whereas previously Transport Malta was being intransigent and these inspections were being carried out where and when they deemed fit, nowadays these inspections are carried out in ports where vessels will have enough time for inspections without hindering schedules. Despite the ever-increasing competition, GM International Services Limited strengthened its leading position in the industry due to its efficiency and quality of services.

GM International Services Limited has come to be known as the flagship company of the group and has truly established itself as a company of international repute. Undoubtedly John A. Gauci-Maistre became renowned as the person who put Malta on the shipping map and the surname Gauci-Maistre became associated with Malta's Maritime flag. True to motto GMI's, Gauci-Maistre strives to serve the world from Malta!

GM Corporate and Fiduciary Services 

John A. Gauci-Maistre did not limit his entrepreneurial spirit to maritime affairs. Due to his nature of being innovative and always at the forefront, he looked at ways at how he could create synergies between shipping and financial services. 1988 was the year that the financial services industry in Malta became fully regulated and GM Nominee was immediately incorporated in order to bridge the gap between these two sectors. 

GM Nominee was managed with the same enthusiasm and drive as its affiliates and similar success was achieved.  However, due to subsequent changes in legislation brought about by phasing out the offshore regime, rebranding was necessary, which gave rise to GM Corporate and Fiduciary Services Limited in 1998. with the aim of promoting the benefits of the relatively new corporate structures known at the time as International Trading Companies. With Malta's accession to the European Union in 2004 certain amendments had to be made to Maltese legislation concerning corporate and fiscal policy and this resulted in, among other things, the corporate structures changing to Malta Holding Companies and Malta (trading) Companies.

As the Malta Government's drive to make Malta a financial services hub continued, new laws had to be enacted to cater to different financial services industries such as those of Remote Gaming, Trusts, Fund Management, and Taxation. These all became sectors in which GM Corporate & Fiduciary Services Limited became active and helps promote overseas.  The growth of the company is a testament to the emphasize John Gauci-Maistre places on the design and administration of tax-efficient structures under local legislation that suit the requirements of the individual international client in a timely and cost-efficient manner.

GM International Conferences & Exhibitions Limited 

This company was established in order to further synergize Malta's economic pillars into a reputable group of companies.  The most notable event of GM International Conferences & Exhibitions Limited to date is ‘Play Me I’m Yours, the brainchild of Luke Jerram.  ‘Play Me, I’m Yours’ Malta was the first ever to be hosted on a national level and was live throughout September and October 2011. This event was part of a group of companies' Corporate Social Responsibility program, GM For You, that Gauci-Maistre personally supervised. Despite, being the initiative of his son and Director Dr. Jean-Pie Gauci-Maistre, John A. Gauci-Maistre played an active role in this event as he is ultimately committed to supporting the local community through various initiatives.

Other posts 

John A. Gauci-Maistre served on the boards of the Malta Chamber of Commerce, Enterprise, and Industry formerly known as the Malta Chamber of Commerce and the Malta Trade Fairs Corporation. John A. Gauci-Maistre K.M. served also as President of the Maltese – Italian Chamber of Commerce and President of the Casino Maltese between 2009 and 2011.

In 2018 he was the organizer of the Malta Maritime Summit. The main focus of the Summit was the current European Union Maritime strategy, logistics, security, finance, digitalization, sustainability, and Brexit.

Sovereign Military Order of St. John Hospitallier 

In 2000 John A. Gauci-Maistre was also knighted by the Sovereign Military Order of St. John.

Personal life 

John A. Gauci-Maistre is married to Ann Marie née Pace and they have four children Rebecca, Sarah, Jean-Pie, and Greta, and seven grandchildren Emma, Jean, Julia, Amy, Mya, Benji, and Mark

Gauci-Maistre is an avid yachtsman and is a member of Malta's Rotary Club and has participated in various yachting activities. He also enjoys playing snooker and gardening.

References 

1947 births
Living people
20th-century Maltese businesspeople